Markid Kharabehsi (also Romanized as Markīd Kharābehsī; also known as Khairābād Masjid, Kharaba-Marchit, Kharābeh, Kharābeh Markīt, Margīd, Markīd, Markīd-e Khvābahsī, Markīd Kharābeh, and Masjed Kheyrābād) is a village in Zolbin Rural District, Yamchi District, Marand County, East Azerbaijan Province, Iran. At the 2006 census, its population was 55, in 15 families.

References 

Populated places in Marand County